Untari Road Block is one of the administrative blocks of Palamu district, Jharkhand state, India.

See also
 Palamu Loksabha constituency
 Jharkhand Legislative Assembly
 Jharkhand
 Palamu

References

External links
Blocks of Palamu district

Community development blocks in Jharkhand
Community development blocks in Palamu district